Warner Bros. Television Studios (operating under the name Warner Bros. Television (abbreviated as WBTV); formerly known as Warner Bros. Television Division) is an American television production and distribution studio of the Warner Bros. Television Group division of Warner Bros. (both ultimately owned by Warner Bros. Discovery (WBD)). Alongside Paramount Global's television arm CBS Studios, it serves as a television production arm of The CW (in which WBD has a 12.5% ownership stake), DC Comics and distribution arm of HBO, Cartoon Network and Adult Swim, it also has produced shows for other networks, such as Blindspot on NBC, Person of Interest and East New York on CBS, and Abbott Elementary on ABC, as well as produced shows for other streaming services such as Netflix and Amazon Prime Video such as The Sandman, Lucifer, and The Peripheral.

As of 2015, it is one of the world's two largest television production companies measured by revenue and library (along with Sony Pictures Television).

History

Beginning and saturation 

The division was started on March 21, 1955, with its first head being Jack L. Warner's son-in-law William T. Orr. ABC had approached Warner Bros. initially with the idea of purchasing the studio's film library (WB eventually sold the rights to the negatives of pre-1950 films and pre-1948 cartoons and shorts to Associated Artists Productions, or a.a.p., in 1956). WB formally entered television production with the premiere of its self-titled anthology series Warner Bros. Presents on ABC. The one-hour weekly show featured rotating episodes of television series based on the WB films Casablanca and Kings Row, as well as an original series titled Cheyenne with Clint Walker. The first one-hour television western, Cheyenne became a big hit for the network and the studio with the added advantage of featuring promotions for upcoming Warner Bros. cinema releases in the show's last ten minutes. One such segment for Rebel Without a Cause featured Gig Young notably talking about road safety with James Dean.

With only Cheyenne being a success, WB ended the ten-minute promotions of new films and replaced Warner Bros. Presents with an anthology series titled Conflict.  It was felt that "Conflict" was what the previous series lacked.  Conflict showed the pilots for Maverick and 77 Sunset Strip .

The success of Cheyenne led WBTV to produce many series for ABC such as Westerns (Maverick, Lawman, Colt .45, Bronco, a spin off of Cheyenne, Sugarfoot, and The Alaskans), crime dramas (77 Sunset Strip, Hawaiian Eye, Bourbon Street Beat, and Surfside 6), and other shows such as The Gallant Men and The Roaring Twenties using stock footage from WB war films and gangster films respectively. The company also produced Jack Webb's Red Nightmare starring Jack Kelly for the U.S. Department of Defense that was later shown on American television on Jack Webb's General Electric True.

All shows were made in the manner of WB's B pictures in the 1930s and 1940s; fast-paced, much stock footage from other films, stock music from the Warners music library and contracted stars working long hours for comparatively small salaries with restrictions on their career.

During the 1960 Writers Guild of America strike, WB reused many plots from its films and other television shows under the nom de plume of "W. Hermanos". This was another example of imitating Warner Bros.' B Pictures who would remake an "A" film and switch the setting.

Two of the most popular stars, James Garner and Clint Walker, quit over their conditions. Garner never returned to the Warners fold during this period, instead moving forward into a major theatrical film career. Successful Warners television stars found themselves in leading roles of many of the studio's theatrical films with no increase in salary. Efrem Zimbalist Jr. was simultaneously the lead of 77 Sunset Strip briefly overlapping with a recurring role as "Dandy Jim Buckley" on Maverick, and also headlined several films until exhaustion forced the studio to give him a rest. Many other actors under contract to Warners at the time, who despite their work conditions, did see their stars rise over time, albeit for most only briefly, included Jack Kelly, Will Hutchins, Peter Brown, Ty Hardin, Wayde Preston, John Russell, Donald May, Rex Reason, Richard Long, Van Williams, Roger Smith, Mike Road, Anthony Eisley, Robert Conrad, Robert McQueeney, Dorothy Provine, Diane McBain and Connie Stevens. Edd Byrnes and Troy Donahue would become teen heartthrobs. Another contract player, Englishman Roger Moore (Maverick and The Alaskans), was growing displeased with Warner as his contract was expiring and would relocate to Europe from Hollywood, becoming an international star on television, and eventually, in theatrical films, playing James Bond among other roles. Warners also contracted established stars such as Ray Danton, Peter Breck, Jeanne Cooper and Grant Williams.  These stars often appeared as guest stars, sometimes reprising their series role in another TV series.

The stars appeared in WB cinema releases with no additional salary, with some such as Zimbalist, Walker, Garner (replacing Charlton Heston in Darby's Rangers), and Danton (replacing Robert Evans in The Rise and Fall of Legs Diamond) playing the lead roles; many of the stars appeared in ensemble casts in such films as The Chapman Report and Merill's Marauders. Some stars such as Connie Stevens, Edd Byrnes, Robert Conrad and Roger Smith made albums for Warner Bros. Records.   One particular recording, a novelty tune titled Kookie, Kookie (Lend Me Your Comb) became a big hit for Edd Byrnes and Connie Stevens (1959). The following year, Connie Stevens had her own hit, with Sixteen Reasons.

It was during this period that series, particularly Westerns like Cheyenne and Maverick, and the crime dramas like 77 Sunset Strip, Hawaiian Eye and Surfside 6 featured catchy theme songs that became just as much a part of the American pop culture landscape as the shows themselves. Depending on the particular series (in this case, the Westerns), William Lava or David Buttolph would compose the music, with lyrics by Stan Jones or Paul Francis Webster, among others. For the crime shows, it was up to the songwriting team of Jerry Livingston and Mack David, who also scored the themes for the sitcom Room for One More, and The Bugs Bunny Show.

In 1960, WBTV turned its attentions to the younger viewer as they brought Bugs Bunny and the other WB cartoon characters to prime time, with The Bugs Bunny Show, which featured cartoons released after July 31, 1948 (which had not been sold to Associated Artists Productions), combined with newly animated introductory material. Also, that year saw the debut of The Roaring Twenties, which was thought to be a more benign alternative to Desilu's The Untouchables. Whether or not that was actually the case, it was, in fact, much less successful.

WBTV expanded on its existing genre of Westerns and crime dramas, and in January 1962, produced its first sitcom, Room For One More. Based on the memoirs of Anna Rose, which in 1952 WB made into a movie starring Cary Grant and his then-wife Betsy Drake (the only movie that they worked together in) about a married couple with two children of their own who went on to adopt at least two more. The TV series starred Andrew Duggan and Peggy McCay as George and Anna Rose. Acting legend Mickey Rooney's son Tim, and Ahna Capri, who would continue to do episodic TV roles and feature films (arguably, her best-known movie was Enter the Dragon starring Bruce Lee) were cast as the Rose's natural children. The show only lasted for half a season. In the fall of that year, a WWII drama The Gallant Men debuted, but lasted for only one season.

WBTV exclusively produced shows for the ABC network until 1962, when GE True premiered on CBS.

In 1964, WBTV once again tried to turn a classic film comedy of its own into a sitcom, with No Time for Sergeants. Both the sitcom and the 1958 movie were based on the 1955 Broadway play, which starred Andy Griffith (TV's The United States Steel Hour also adapted the stage play for TV in 1956). The sitcom starred Sammy Jackson as Will Stockdale, a naive Georgia farm boy drafted into the military. 1965 saw the debut of F Troop, a Western spoof taking place at a U.S. Army post after the Civil War. Despite lasting only two seasons, it is still considered a classic of its type. Forrest Tucker, Larry Storch, and Ken Berry led an ensemble cast featuring military misfits, and an Indian tribe, who, among other things, forgot how to do a rain dance.

The streak of identifiable series subsided in 1963 with a halt of using stock company contract players and Jack Webb taking over WBTV and not being particularly successful. However, many series were still filmed at Warner Bros. such as F Troop and The F.B.I.

Later years 

For four years, from 1967 to 1971, the company's lone output was the existing television show The F.B.I. By 1970, several of the former talent from 20th Century-Fox Television as well as former agent writers was defected to Warner Bros., such as Paul Monash, Rod Amateau, Bill Idelson and Harvey Miller, Saul Turteltaub and Bernie Orenstein, Jerry Gardner and Dee Caruso, Hal Kanter and A.J. Carothers. By 1971, the company returned to prime-time shows after producing one show for four years. One of the first shows upon returning were the NBC shows Nichols and The Jimmy Stewart Show and the CBS show The Chicago Teddy Bears. Also that year, animation studio Filmation and Warner Bros. entered a deal to produce cartoons for film and television, with its television subsidiary having global distribution rights.

In 1975, the stars of Lynda Carter, Warner Bros. and DC Comics produced the television series Wonder Woman.

In 1976, the company acquired The Wolper Organization, producer of Chico and the Man and Welcome Back, Kotter. In 1978, Stan Margulies, who produced Roots, signed a three-year exclusive contract with the studio. The following week, Warner had acquired contracts with big names like James Komack, Danny Arnold, the trio of Don Nicholl, Michael Ross and Bernie West (NRW) and the duo of Alan Blye and Bob Einstein to distribute programs worldwide. 

In 1979, Warner Bros. Television produced the television series The Dukes of Hazzard.

In 1980, Phillip Saltzman and his Woodruff Productions company signed a deal with the studio.

In 1982, Aaron Spelling and his production company had struck a deal with the studio to distribute the shows. The pact would continue until 1988. On June 1, 1986, Alan Shayne has left as president of the studio after 10 years, to start out a new production company, Alan Shayne Productions, which will be affiliated in association with the studio, in order to develop four made-for-TV movies and miniseries projects, which was developed for the 1987–88 season. In 1988, it acquired Lorimar-Telepictures. Telepictures later became a television production company.

In 1992, Witt/Thomas Productions signed a television contract with Warner Bros. after the previous contract with Disney was not renewed. In 1993, two Time Warner-affiliated production companies Quincy Jones Entertainment and David Salzman Entertainment had merged their companies to form Quincy Jones-David Salzman Entertainment, which was affiliated with Warner Bros. and Time Warner. Not too long after that, Lorimar Television was folded into WBTV, taking some key members with them. In 1993, Tom Arnold and Roseanne Barr via Wapello County Productions struck a deal with the studio.

In 1994, writers-producers of Friends, Kevin Bright, Martha Kauffman and David Crane, and associated with the studio since 1992 had struck its exclusive deal with the studio. In 1996, Warner Bros. Television collaborated with Universal Television to develop the series Spy Game for ABC, with Universal alumnus Sam Raimi and Robert Tapert of Renaissance Pictures, and Warner alumnus John McNamara producing the series, but it didn't last long, as it only lasted one season on the air.

In 2001, Warner Bros. Television fully took over distribution of H-B related properties produced by Warner Bros. Animation such as Scooby-Doo, producing a steady stream of Scooby direct-to-video films and two new series, What's New, Scooby-Doo? (2002–2006) and Shaggy & Scooby-Doo Get a Clue! (2006–2008). In 2006, WBTV made some of its vast library of programs available for free viewing on the Internet (through sister company AOL's IN2TV service), with Welcome Back, Kotter as its marquee offering. Some of these programs have not been seen publicly since their last syndicated release in the 1980s.

On June 11, 2012, WBTV acquired Alloy Entertainment. On June 2, 2014, Warner Bros. Television Group purchased all of Eyeworks' companies outside of the United States, rebranding as Warner Bros. International Television Production. Eyeworks USA however, will remain independent.

In 2020, Warner Bros. Television was renamed Warner Bros. Television Studios as part of WarnerMedia's restructuring of its television divisions. The Warner Bros. Television name continues to be used on-screen, as well as the company's trade name.

On November 30, 2022, WBTV head Channing Dungey announced that they were in talks with Amazon to make animated DC content for its streaming service Amazon Prime Video.

Divisions 
In addition to the main Warner Bros. Television Studios label, the company also owns and operates the following production companies in the United States:

Current

Warner Horizon Unscripted Television 

Warner Horizon Unscripted Television is Warner Bros. Television Studios' alternative television, cable and streaming production unit; founded in 2006, it originally operated as a singular label encompassing both scripted and unscripted productions. Notable series and films produced by the Warner Horizon units include The Bachelor dating show franchise, The Voice, Pretty Little Liars (and spin-offs Ravenswood and Pretty Little Liars: The Perfectionists), Ellen's Game of Games, Fuller House, The Masked Dancer, Whose Line Is It Anyway?, You and Pennyworth.

On August 10, 2020, Warner Bros. Television Group separated the Warner Horizon label into two standalone companies maintaining individualized production focuses:
 Warner Horizon Scripted Television—which combined its operations with those of Warner Bros. Television through the Warner Horizon split-up—focuses on production of scripted comedic and dramatic programs for cable networks and subscription-based streaming platforms.
 Warner Horizon Unscripted Television—which was folded into Warner Bros. Unscripted & Alternative Television under the realignment—focuses on production of reality television programs, documentaries and other alternative programming formats for broadcast and cable networks, and subscription-based streaming platforms.

All3Media 

All3Media Limited (50% owned with Liberty Global) is a British worldwide independent television, film and digital production and distribution company. The All3Media group comprises 40 production and distribution companies from across the United Kingdom and all other parts of Europe (IDTV in the Netherlands and All3Media Deutschland in Germany), New Zealand (South Pacific Pictures) and the United States.

Alloy Entertainment 

Alloy Entertainment is a creative think tank that develops and produces original books, television series and feature films. The company, a division of Warner Bros. Television Group, generates unique commercial entertainment franchises and collaborates with authors, leading publishers, streaming services, television networks and movie studios to deliver its properties to the world. Notable series and films produced by Alloy include The Sisterhood of the Traveling Pants, Gossip Girl, The Vampire Diaries, Pretty Little Liars, The 100, The Sun is Also a Star, Everything, Everything and You.

Blue Ribbon Content 
Formed in 2014, Blue Ribbon Content (BRC) is Warner Bros. Television Studios' digital series production unit, continuing the Television Group's commitment to creating new and compelling programming for the digital marketplace. BRC is charged with developing and producing live-action series for digital platforms, tapping the creative talent already working at the Studio while also identifying opportunities for collaboration with new writers and producers. In addition to live-action programming, BRC produces animated programming as well as content for emerging platforms such as virtual reality. BRC takes its name from the classic "Blue Ribbon" features that show up in select Merrie Melodies and Looney Tunes cartoons.

BRC's slate includes original program concepts as well as new shows based on Warner Bros.’s wide-ranging collection of intellectual property. Live-action BRC productions include series such as the horror/thriller Critters: A New Binge for Shudder and horror/comedy The Pledge for CW Seed, as well as the following original films: The Banana Splits Movie and Critters Attack! for Warner Bros. Home Entertainment and Syfy, plus Good Girls Get High for AT&T's DirectTV Cinema. BRC also produces the upcoming mixed-media series BizarroTV for DC Universe, plus the animated series Deathstroke: Knights & Dragons for CW Seed.

Telepictures 

Telepictures is a producer of innovative, multiplatform television series and digital content for the first-run syndication, cable, streaming and digital marketplace. Programs produced by Telepictures have won 93 Emmy Awards in the last 20 years, including Outstanding Talk Show or Outstanding Talk Show Host for 16 of the last 19 years. Telepictures series include the No. 1 entertainment talk show  The Ellen DeGeneres Show, as well as Extra, Judge Mathis, The People's Court, The Real and TMZ, in addition to the NBC primetime series Ellen's Game of Games and Ellen's Greatest Night of Giveaways (both produced in association with Warner Horizon Unscripted Television). Telepictures is also producing the upcoming Elizabeth Smart-led series Smart Justice for Lifetime and the new HBO Max competition series Ellen's Next Great Designer.

Cartoon Network Studios 

Cartoon Network Studios is the production arm of Cartoon Network, and started operating in 1994 as a division of Hanna-Barbera until 2001 when the latter absorbed into Warner Bros. Animation. Located in Burbank, California, the studio primarily produces and develops animated programs and shorts for Cartoon Network and later Cartoonito. In the 2010s and beyond, their programs began to expand into their sister companies Adult Swim and HBO Max. So far, the company has only produced one theatrically released film, The Powerpuff Girls Movie, distributed by its sister company, Warner Bros. Pictures.

The actual animation service for their productions is done overseas, mainly in South Korea at Digital eMation, Saerom Animation, Rough Draft Korea, and Sunmin Image Pictures, with pre-production and post-production being United States-based.

Warner Bros. Animation 

Warner Bros. Animation Inc. is an American animation studio closely associated with the Looney Tunes and Merrie Melodies characters, among others. The studio is the successor to Warner Bros. Cartoons, the studio which produced Looney Tunes and Merrie Melodies cartoon shorts from 1933 to 1963, and from 1967 to 1969. Warner reestablished its animation division in 1980 to produce Looney Tunes–related works, and TBS merged with Time Warner (later called WarnerMedia) in 1996. It replaces Warner Bros. Cartoons and since March 2001, it also replaces Hanna-Barbera as well.

In recent years, Warner Bros. Animation has focused primarily on producing television and direct-to-video animation featuring characters Looney Tunes, Scooby-Doo, Tom and Jerry, Hanna-Barbera library, Superman, Batman and Wonder Woman created by other properties owned by Warner Bros., including DC Comics, the MGM cartoon studio (via Turner Entertainment Co.) and Hanna-Barbera Productions.

Williams Street 

Williams Street Productions, LLC, d/b/a Williams Street and formerly known as Ghost Planet Industries, is an American animation and live action television production studio the in-house production arm of Cartoon Network’s late night adult block Adult Swim. Mike Lazzo and Keith Crofford oversaw operations for the building for most of its existence.

In December 2019, co-founder Lazzo retired from the company, with business partner and co-founder Crofford retiring the following year. Michael Ouweleen was named president in 2020.

Former

Warner Bros. Kids, Young Adults and Classics 

Warner Bros. Kids, Young Adults and Classics (KYAC; often known as Warner Bros. Global Kids, Young Adults and Classics), formerly known as Warner Bros. Global Kids and Young Adults, was a division of Warner Bros. Entertainment. It was established on March 4, 2019, as part of a major reorganization of Warner Bros.' now-defunct parent company, WarnerMedia.

On March 4, 2019, AT&T announced a major reorganization of WarnerMedia to effectively dissolve the Turner Broadcasting System division, which involved Cartoon Network, Boomerang, Adult Swim, Turner Classic Movies, and digital media company Otter Media being transferred to Warner Bros. Entertainment. Aside from TCM and Otter – which was transferred over to WarnerMedia Entertainment on May 31, 2019, to oversee development on an upcoming over-the-top streaming service from WarnerMedia – the newly transferred properties came under a newly formed Global Kids & Young Adults division.

The division was responsible for overseeing the parent company's family, kids, animation, and young adult properties, its properties include the former Turner Broadcasting System cable television networks Cartoon Network (including the programming blocks Adult Swim, Toonami, Cartoonito, and ACME Night), Boomerang, and Turner Classic Movies; and the animation studios Warner Bros. Animation, Cartoon Network Studios and Williams Street.

On April 7, 2020, Tom Ascheim was named president of the division, now renamed Warner Bros. Global Kids, Young Adults and Classics, overseeing Cartoon Network, Boomerang and Adult Swim, and adding Turner Classic Movies to his oversight.

On May 11, 2022, Tom Ascheim exited as President of KYAC due to Warner Bros. Discovery's leadership restructuring the organization and eliminating his role. The studios were moved under Warner Bros. Television while Kathleen Finch's U.S. Networks Group assumed oversight over the linear networks, effectively dissolving the unit.

Warner Bros. Domestic Television Distribution 

Warner Bros. Domestic Television Distribution (formerly Warner Bros. Television Distribution) is the television distribution and broadcast syndication arm of Warner Bros. Television Studios.

Established on January 10, 1972, the arm was originally known as Warner Bros. Television Distribution before taking on its current name in 1989 following the acquisition of Lorimar-Telepictures. In 1991, Keith Samples, who was employee of the studio left Warner Bros., of which the employment staff inherited from Lorimar, who had joined it in 1986, to start out a TV syndication company Rysher Entertainment.

In 1999, it reached a deal with NBC Enterprises to pick up the off-net syndication rights to the sitcom Will & Grace.

International operations

Australia 
Warner Bros. International Television Production Australia (WBITPA) was founded in 2004 as Eyeworks Australia before being rebranded in 2014.

As Eyeworks Australia, shows produced include Celebrity Splash, Being Lara Bingle, Gangs of Oz and Territory Cops. Following the rebrand, WBITPA began producing The Bachelor Australia from its fourth season, spin-offs The Bachelorette Australia from its second season & Bachelor in Paradise, as well as First Dates, the eighth season of Who Do You Think You Are?, the sixteenth season of Dancing with the Stars and The Masked Singer Australia.

New Zealand 
WBITVP New Zealand produces some of New Zealand's most successful entertainment shows including RuPaul's Drag Race Down Under, The Bachelor NZ, The Bachelorette NZ, The Block NZ, Celebrity Treasure Island, Glow Up, House of Drag and The Great Kiwi Bake Off.

Spain 
The Spanish subsidiary was acquired as part of the Eyeworks takeover in 2014. Eyeworks España was renamed Warner Bros. International Television Production España in December 2015.

Along with Mediaset España and Netflix, the company also co-produced Brigada Costa del Sol.

United Kingdom 
Warner Bros. Television Productions UK

Established as Shed Productions in 1998, the company was acquired by Time Warner in 2010, before being rebranded as Warner Bros. Television Productions UK in 2015.

Hanna-Barbera Studios Europe

On April 7, 2021, it was announced that Cartoon Network Studios Europe had re-branded as Hanna-Barbera Studios Europe, The Hanna-Barbera name had previously been revived on some Warner Bros. Animation series and films based on the classic franchises, including Scooby-Doo media, like The Jetsons & WWE: Robo-WrestleMania!, the 2017 reboot of Wacky Races, and Yabba-Dabba Dinosaurs. Future plans for the studio have yet to be announced, however. The first projects to be greenlit under the new name were a new series and a movie relating to The Amazing World of Gumball.

Productions 

Notable shows produced and distributed by Warner Bros. Television include Wonder Woman, The Dukes of Hazzard, The Big Bang Theory, Friends, Supernatural, Two and a Half Men, The Fresh Prince of Bel-Air, Young Sheldon, Abbott Elementary, and many others.

References

External links 
 

 
Television
American companies established in 1955
Television production companies of the United States
Entertainment companies based in California
Companies based in Burbank, California
Entertainment companies established in 1955
Mass media companies established in 1955
1955 establishments in California
Television syndication distributors